Karrakatta railway station is a railway station on the Transperth network in Western Australia. It is located on the Airport line and Fremantle line,  from Perth station serving the suburb of Karrakatta.

History
Karrakatta station opened in 1886. The station closed on 1 September 1979 along with the rest of the Fremantle line, re-opening on 29 July 1983 when services were restored.

The station has received Airport line services since 10 October 2022.

Services
Karrakatta station is served by the Airport and Fremantle lines on the Transperth network. Services are operated by Transperth Train Operations, a division of the PTA. The Fremantle line runs between Fremantle station and Perth station, continuing past Perth as the Midland line. The Airport line, which commenced regular services on 10 October 2022, goes between High Wycombe station and Claremont station.

Airport line and Fremantle line trains stop at Karrakatta every 12 minutes each during peak hour for a combined frequency of a train every 6 minutes. Outside peak hour and on weekends and public holidays, each line has a train every 15 minutes for a combined frequency of 7.5 minutes. Late at night, each line has a half-hourly or hourly frequency.

Karrakatta station saw 66,562 passengers in the 2013–14 financial year, making it the least used station on the Fremantle line.

References

Fremantle line
Railway stations in Perth, Western Australia
Railway stations in Australia opened in 1886
Karrakatta, Western Australia
Airport line, Perth